The 1826 United Kingdom general election saw the Tories under the Earl of Liverpool win a substantial and increased majority over the Whigs. In Ireland, liberal Protestant candidates favouring Catholic emancipation, backed by the Catholic Association, achieved significant gains.

The seventh United Kingdom Parliament was dissolved on 2 June 1826. The new Parliament was summoned to meet on 25 July 1826, for a maximum seven-year term from that date. The maximum term could be and normally was curtailed, by the monarch dissolving the Parliament, before its term expired. As of 2023, the Earl of Liverpool remains the most recent Prime Minister to have won four successive elections.

Political situation
The Tory leader was the Earl of Liverpool, who had been Prime Minister since his predecessor's assassination in 1812. Liverpool had led his party to three general election victories before that of 1826. The Tory Leader of the House of Commons until 1822, when he committed suicide, was Robert Stewart. He was known by the courtesy title of Viscount Castlereagh, until he inherited his father's Irish peerage and became the 2nd Marquess of Londonderry in 1821. Londonderry was replaced as leader by George Canning, who remained Leader of the House of Commons in 1826.

The Whig Party continued to suffer from weak leadership, particularly in the House of Commons.

In 1824 the Earl Grey gave up the formal Whig leadership in the Lords, although he remained the most prominent Whig peer. Grey asked his friends to look to the leadership of the Marquess of Lansdowne. Although Lansdowne performed the functions of leader, he did not accept the title.

At the time of the general election, Grey was still the leading figure amongst the Whig peers. It was likely that he would have been invited to form a government, had the Whigs come to power, although in this era the monarch rather than the governing party decided which individual would be Prime Minister.

The Leader of the Opposition in the House of Commons at the previous general election, George Tierney, disclaimed the leadership on 23 January 1821. No new Whig leader emerged during the rest of the Parliament.

There had been significant developments in Irish politics since the 1820 general election. Whilst Catholics in Ireland—who met the normal property qualifications—had been permitted to vote since before the Union, they were still not eligible to sit in the United Kingdom Parliament. The right for Catholics to serve in Parliament was known as a measure of Catholic emancipation. In 1823, Daniel O'Connell started a campaign for repeal of the Act of Union, and took Catholic Emancipation as his rallying call, establishing the Catholic Association.

From 1826, the Catholic Association began to support pro-emancipation candidates in elections.  The Association used its money and manpower to campaign for candidates to be elected into Parliament, to pressure the government from within to pass Catholic emancipation.

Dates of election
At this period there was not one election day. After receiving a writ (a royal command) for the election to be held, the local returning officer fixed the election timetable for the particular constituency or constituencies he was concerned with. Polling in seats with contested elections could continue for many days.

The general election took place between the first contest on 7 June and the last contest on 12 July 1826.

Summary of the constituencies
In 1821 the borough of Grampound in Cornwall was disenfranchised for corruption. Its two seats were transferred to the county of Yorkshire, which from this general election became a four-seat constituency.

Monmouthshire (1 County constituency with 2 MPs and one single member Borough constituency) is included in Wales in these tables. Sources for this period may include the county in England.

Table 1: Constituencies and MPs, by type and country

Table 2: Number of seats per constituency, by type and country

See also
United Kingdom general elections
List of MPs elected in the 1826 United Kingdom general election

Notes

References
 British Electoral Facts 1832–1999, compiled and edited by Colin Rallings and Michael Thrasher (Ashgate Publishing Ltd 2000). Source: Dates of Elections – Footnote to Table 5.02
 British Historical Facts 1760–1830, by Chris Cook and John Stevenson (The Macmillan Press 1980). Source: Types of constituencies – Great Britain
 His Majesty's Opposition 1714–1830, by Archibald S. Foord (Oxford University Press 1964)
 Parliamentary Election Results in Ireland 1801–1922, edited by B.M. Walker (Royal Irish Academy 1978). Source: Types of constituencies – Ireland

 
1826 elections in the United Kingdom
General election
1826
June 1826 events
July 1826 events
1820s elections in Ireland